The 39th Women's Boat Race took place on 24 March 1984. The contest was between crews from the Universities of Oxford and Cambridge and held as part of the Henley Boat Races along a two-kilometre course.

Background
The first Women's Boat Race was conducted on The Isis in 1927.

Race
Cambridge won by four and a half lengths.

See also
The Boat Race 1984

References

External links
 Official website

Women's Boat Race
1984 in English sport
Boat
March 1984 sports events in the United Kingdom
1984 in women's rowing
1984 sports events in London